Gibraltar competed at the 2013 World Championships in Athletics in Moscow, Russia, from 10–18 August 2013. A team of one athlete represented the country in the event.

Results

Men

Track and road events

References

External links
IAAF World Championships – Gibraltar

Nations at the 2013 World Championships in Athletics
World Championships in Athletics
Gibraltar at the World Championships in Athletics